John Henry Blake (1808 – 29 June 1882), was a murdered Irish land agent.

Biography
John Henry Blake was the third and youngest son of Lieutenant-Colonel John Blake of Furbo, County Galway and Maria Galway of Cork. He was a member of one of The Tribes of Galway. He worked firstly as a bailiff on the Blake estate at Furbo, but in the late 1830s moved to Kiltullagh, Athenry, to act as his infant nephew's land agent. He lived at Rathville House, Raford, in the parish of Kiltullagh.

In later life, Blake was agent to Hubert de Burgh-Canning, 2nd Marquess of Clanricarde. Clanricarde was commonly held to be the worst landlord in all Ireland, and infamous for his evicting of tenants  However, he lived in London so it was easier to target Blake. Both he and his driver, Thady Ruane, were shot on the way to attend mass in Loughrea. His wife, who was present, survived the incident. Despite several months of investigation and seven arrests on suspicion, no one stood trial for the murders.

The incident occurred during the height of the Land War and was one of a long series of deaths and aggravations that occurred at this time in the county. It was especially shocking as it was the assassination of an agent of a peer of the realm.

He was survived by his wife Harriet (died 1917) and their sons Edmond (1876–1944) and Henry. He was buried in the family tomb at Furbo.

See also 
 James Connors (Kiltullagh)
 List of unsolved murders
 Martin O'Halloran
 Peter Dempsey (Kiltullagh)

References

Books
 The Land War in South East Galway (1879–1891), a thesis by Anne Finnegan
 The Woodford Evictions, a thesis by Thomas Feeney
 A Forgotten Campaign, ed. Michael Shiel and Desmond Roache, n.d.
 Clanricarde Country, Woodford Heritage Group, Woodford, n.d.
 Maamtrasna - The Murders and the Mystery, Jarlath Waldron, de Burca, Dublin, 1992
 Daly of Raford, James N. Dillon, in Kiltullagh/Killimorday - As The Centuries Passed:A History from 1500-1900, ed. Kieran Jordan, 2000. 
 Blakes of Rathville House, James N. Dillon, in op. cit.
 The Land Wars, Kevin and Kieran Jordan, in op.cit.
 John Henry Black - Victim or Villain?, Catherine Kelly Desmond, in op. cit.

1808 births
1880s murders in Ireland
1882 deaths
19th-century Irish people
Deaths by firearm in Ireland
Irish murder victims
Male murder victims
1882 murders in the United Kingdom
People from County Galway
People murdered in Ireland
Unsolved murders in Ireland